Peter Tolkin + Sarah Lorenzen Architecture (TOLO), formerly Peter Tolkin Architecture, is an architectural firm based in Los Angeles, California, established in 1998.

Overview
The practice's early work focused on the revitalization and redevelopment of buildings in Old Town Pasadena. In several adaptive reuse projects, Peter Tolkin developed an expertise in pedestrian-scaled urban commercial and retail projects. Peter Tolkin's experience in Old Pasadena led to work in other cities with downtown revitalization plans, such as Santa Monica and Long Beach.

Since then, the practice has completed several larger projects. In Merced, the office planned and designed a series of mixed-use buildings, in conjunction with a comprehensive downtown revitalization. For Claremont, the practice was responsible for the planning of the West Village Expansion, a project encompassing retail, movie theaters, hotel facilities, and a town square. The practice's winning proposal for the development of a two-city-block mixed-use project called Metlox in Manhattan Beach created a public space connecting the city's civic center with its main commercial street. The urban planning project includes a town square, boutique hotel, restaurants, retail shops, offices, and underground parking.

As a counterpart to these public projects, the practice has also designed a number of projects in the private realm, including the award-winning Saladang Song restaurant, Long Beach Promenade Lofts and Marmion Court Housing. Award-winning and published private residences include the Sherman Residence and Malibu Residence (Sunglass House), and the recently completed Branch House in Montecito and a house for the gallerist Susanne Vielmetter in Altadena.

Recognized as a Design Vanguard firm by Architectural Record, Peter Tolkin's work has been published in Domus, The New York Times, The Los Angeles Times, Dwell, and Interior Design, among other international publications.

In 2018, Sarah Lorenzen joined Peter Tolkin Architecture as a principal and the practice became Peter Tolkin + Sarah Lorenzen Architecture (TOLO).

Selected projects
 Sherman Residence- featured in Fracture (2007), and CSI: Miami
 Branch House- featured in Santa Barbara Independent
 Malibu Residence or the Sunglass House - featured in Interior Design (magazine) and Los Angeles Times
 Saladang Song Thai Restaurant-a Pasadena restaurant constructed out of laser-cut steel screens and slabs. The patio-style restaurant takes inspiration from the traditional Thai sala, or outdoor pavilion.
 Claremont Downtown- a re-design and expansion of Claremont's downtown
 Maison 140, in conjunction with Kelly Wearstler in Interior Design (magazine)
 Metlox- shopping district and town square, a large-scale mixed-use development in Manhattan Beach
 Bike Transit Center- a tunnel-like shelter for bike users across from the Metro L Line Memorial Park station in Old Town Pasadena. The structure uses photovoltaic and light polycarbonate material in its 5-foot modules.
Red Carpet in C - featured in KCET Artbound.

Awards
Saladang Song was a finalist for the James Beard Foundation restaurant design awards, and it received a merit award from the Los Angeles AIA and an Honor award from the Pasadena & Foothill chapters of the American Institute of Architects.
2002 Peter Tolkin featured in Architectural Record as one of ten “vanguard” international firms.
2006 AIA Award—Pasadena Bike Transit Center 
2007 AIA Award—Malibu Residence
2009 LA Architectural Award, Design Concept—Pasadena Bike Transit Center

References
Architectural Record Vanguard 2002
James Beard Foundation Awards 2001
AIA Pasadena & Foothills Design Awards - Bike Transit Center
 Interior Design Magazine, Peter Tolkin and Deborah Goldstein Design A Contemporary Malibu Pad
Sunglass House in the LA Times 
Tour of Sunglass House
Interview with Sarah Lorenzen and Peter Tolkin on Archinect
New owners of Sherman Residence in LA Times
Charles Gaines proposal for the High Line
Review of Santa Monica Yacht CLub Restaurant
Peter Tolkin in Places Journal
Peter Tolkin in Planetizen
Scenes from Ghana by Peter Tolkin and Mabel Wilson
Sherman House in the Movies
Article on the Branch House in Montecito in the Santa Barbara Independent

External links
 Official website
 Houzz website

Architecture firms based in California